Cat Among the Pigeons is a work of detective fiction by Agatha Christie, first published in the UK by the Collins Crime Club on 2 November 1959, and in the US by Dodd, Mead and Company in March 1960 with a copyright date of 1959. The UK edition retailed at twelve shillings and sixpence (12/6), and the US edition at $2.95.

It features Christie's Belgian detective, Hercule Poirot, who makes a very late appearance in the final third of the novel. The emphasis on espionage in the early part of the story relates it to Christie's international adventures (such as They Came to Baghdad) and to the Tommy and Tuppence stories.

Plot summary
A revolution takes place within Ramat, a fictional kingdom in the Middle East. Knowing that he is unlikely to survive the violence, Prince Ali Yusuf entrusts his best friend and pilot, Bob Rawlinson, to smuggle a fortune in jewels out of the country. Rawlinson conceals the gems within the hollow of the handle of a tennis racquet belonging to his niece Jennifer, the daughter of his sister Joan, without telling them. Unbeknownst to him, a mysterious woman watches him from the neighboring balcony. The Prince and Rawlinson die in a plane crash while attempting to flee Ramat. Three months later, Jennifer prepares to attend  Meadowbank School, a prestigious girls' independent school in England. Its staff includes Miss Bulstrode, the school's founder and headmistress; Miss Chadwick, a co-founder of the school and teacher of mathematics; Miss Vansittart, a teacher at the school for several years; Miss Rich, a teacher at the school for eighteen months; Miss Johnson, the girl's matron; Miss Angèle Blanche, the new French teacher; Grace Springer, the new gym teacher; Ann Shapland, Miss Bulstrode's new secretary; and Adam Goodman, a new gardener. As Miss Bulstrode is nearing retirement, she is deciding upon her successor. As Miss Chadwick is seen as not the type to lead the school, Bulstrode is considering both Miss Vansittart, the most likely successor, and Miss Rich, who is young and has many ideas of her own.

One night, as Miss Johnson and Miss Chadwick are on their way to investigate a suspicious light in the new Sports Pavilion, a shot is heard and they rush in only to find Miss Springer dead. When the police begin to investigate, Goodman reveals to Inspector Kelsey, and later to Miss Bulstrode, that he works for British Intelligence. He is at Meadowbank to track down the gems Rawlinson smuggled out, by monitoring Prince Ali Yusuf's cousin, Shaista, who is attending the school. Meanwhile, Jennifer complains to her friend Julia Upjohn that her racquet no longer feels balanced, and they swap racquets. Later, a strange woman approaches Jennifer to present her with a new racquet, claiming it is from her Aunt Gina, and takes Jennifer's old racquet in exchange. However, the sharper Julia finds this suspicious, and Aunt Gina later writes to reveal that she had not sent her niece the new racquet. The following weekend, Shaista is kidnapped by someone posing as her uncle's chauffeur. That night, Miss Vansittart is murdered with a sandbag in the Sports Pavilion.

After Jennifer and many other students are fetched home by worried parents, Julia investigates Jennifer's racquet and finds the smuggled jewels. When someone attempts to enter her room during the night, she quickly flees the school to tell her story to Hercule Poirot, who she has heard stories about from her "Aunt" Maureen (Mrs. Summerhayes from Mrs. McGinty's Dead). While Poirot is at Meadowbank investigating the murders, Miss Blanche is murdered with a sandbag. Interviewing Miss Bulstrode, Poirot learns that Julia's mother, Mrs. Upjohn, had noticed someone at the school the first day of the term whom she knew from fifteen years earlier while serving in counterintelligence during the war.

Poirot eventually reveals to all that the Shaista who attended Meadowbank was an imposter; the real Shaista was kidnapped by a group seeking Prince Ali Yusuf's jewels. When the imposter does not find them, the group extracts her from the school before the uncle of the real Shaista can expose her. Poirot briefly focusses attention on Miss Rich as a potential suspect, so he can put the true murderer at ease. Poirot reveals that Miss Springer was killed because she caught the killer searching for the tennis racquet, and Miss Blanche was killed for her attempted blackmail of the killer.

Then, through Mrs. Upjohn, Poirot identifies Ann Shapland as the ruthless espionage agent known as "Angelica". Miss Shapland had been in Ramat three months earlier and was the woman who had witnessed Rawlinson concealing the gems in Jennifer's racquet. Before Miss Shapland is arrested, she attempts to shoot Mrs. Upjohn. As Miss Bulstrode tries to shield her, Miss Chadwick steps in to protect Miss Bulstrode and is fatally wounded. Miss Shapland is disarmed and taken away. Poirot then reveals that the second murder was committed by Miss Chadwick, who was jealous of Miss Vansittart as Miss Bulstrode's chosen successor to head Meadowbank. Miss Chadwick came upon Miss Vansittart in the Sports Pavilion and impulsively struck her down in a fit of madness.

In the aftermath of the investigation, Miss Bulstrode appoints Miss Rich as her partner and successor, with both focusing on rebuilding Meadowbank and its reputation. Meanwhile, Poirot turns over the gems to Mr. Robinson, who then visits an English woman who had secretly married Prince Ali Yusuf when he was a student and had their son. Julia receives an emerald as a reward.

Characters
 Hercule Poirot, the famed Belgian detective
 Inspector Kelsey, the investigating officer
 “Adam Goodman”, an operative for Special Branch, working undercover at Meadowbank as a gardener
 Honoria Bulstrode, headmistress of Meadowbank School for Girls
 Ann Shapland, Miss Bulstrode's secretary
 Elspeth Johnson, the matron
 Miss Chadwick, a long-serving and senior teacher of mathematics who helped found Meadowbank
 Eleanor Vansittart, a senior teacher, set to succeed Miss Bulstrode
 Grace Springer, a sports teacher 
 Angèle Blanche, a French teacher who is using the passport and teaching history of her late sister to get this good position.
 Eileen Rich, a teacher
 Miss Blake, a teacher
 Miss Rowan, a teacher
 Princess Shaista, the cousin of the late Prince Ali Yusuf of Ramat
 Prince Ali Yusuf, hereditary Sheikh of Ramat
 Bob Rawlinson, the personal pilot of the Prince of Ramat (and the Prince's best friend)
 Jennifer Sutcliffe, niece of Bob Rawlinson and pupil at Meadowbank; daughter of Joan and Henry Sutcliffe
 Lady Veronica Carlton-Sandways, the disruptive and tipsy mother of twin daughters enrolled at the school
 Joan Sutcliffe, Bob Rawlinson's sister and Jennifer's mother
 Henry Sutcliffe, Joan's husband and Jennifer's father
 Julia Upjohn, pupil at Meadowbank and Jennifer's friend
 Mrs Upjohn, Julia Upjohn's mother, and a former British intelligence agent
 Colonel Ephraim Pikeaway, a senior figure in Special Branch, Adam Goodman's superior
 John Edmundson, a member of the Foreign Office; third secretary in the British embassy in Ramat at the time of the revolution.
 Derek O'Connor, a member of the Foreign Office
 "Mr Robinson", a shadowy figure, of importance in international affairs
 Denis Rathbone, Ann Shapland's boyfriend
 Briggs, the gardener

Literary significance and reception
Maurice Richardson of The Observer of 8 November 1959 said, "Some nice school scenes with bogus sheikhs sweeping up in lilac Cadillacs to deposit highly scented and busted houris for education, and backwoods peers shoving hockey-stick-toting daughters out of battered Austins. It's far from vintage Christie, but you'll want to know who."

Robert Barnard: "Girls' school background surprisingly well done, with humour and some liberality of outlook. Some elements are reminiscent of Tey's Miss Pym Disposes. Marred by the international dimension and the spy element, which do not jell with the traditional detective side. Fairly typical example of her looser, more relaxed style."

Film, TV or theatrical adaptations

British adaptation
An adaptation of the novel was made for the series Agatha Christie's Poirot on 28 September 2008, starring David Suchet as Hercule Poirot. The cast included Dame Harriet Walter as Miss Bulstrode, Natasha Little as Ann Shapland, Claire Skinner as Miss Rich, Susan Wooldridge as Miss Chadwick, Miranda Raison as Mlle Blanche, Elizabeth Berrington as Miss Springer, Raji James as Prince Ali Yusuf, and Adam Croasdell as Adam Goodman. Written by Mark Gatiss, the adaptation featured a change in setting to the 1930s, matching that for the TV series, which meant that many of the novel's scenes set in Egypt and the Middle East, as well as those related to the British secret service had to be rewritten or eliminated.

Filming took place primarily at Joyce Grove in Nettlebed, Oxfordshire, with some shots inside the marble hall of Elveden Hall.

French adaptation
The novel was adapted as the fifth episode of the French television series Les Petits Meurtres d'Agatha Christie. The episode first aired in 2010.

Publication history
 1959, Collins Crime Club (London), 2 November 1959, Hardcover, 256 pp
 1960, Dodd Mead and Company (New York), March 1960, Hardcover, 224 pp
 1961, Pocket Books (New York), Paperback, 216 pp
 1962, Fontana Books (Imprint of HarperCollins), Paperback, 187 pp
 1964, Ulverscroft Large-print Edition, Hardcover, 255 pp
 1976, Pocket Books (New York), 8th printing, February, 1976, Paperback, xi, 210 pp

In the UK the novel was first serialised in the weekly magazine John Bull in six abridged instalments from 26 September (Volume 106, Number 2771) to 31 October 1959 (Volume 106, Number 2776) with illustrations by Gerry Fancett. In the US a condensed version of the novel appeared in the November 1959 (Volume LXXVI, Number 11) issue of the Ladies Home Journal with an illustration by Joe DeMers.

References

External links
Cat Among the Pigeons at the official Agatha Christie website
 Cat Among the Pigeons at Home of Agatha Christie website

1959 British novels
Hercule Poirot novels
Novels first published in serial form
Works originally published in John Bull (magazine)
Collins Crime Club books
Novels set in boarding schools
British novels adapted into television shows